The Fort Worth Missing Trio refers to an unsolved missing persons case that began on December 23, 1974, when three girls  Mary Rachel Trlica, Lisa Renee Wilson, and Julie Ann Moseley  went missing while Christmas shopping at the Seminary South Shopping Center in Fort Worth, Texas, United States. The car the girls were driving, a 1972 Oldsmobile 98, was left behind in the Sears parking lot at the mall; the girls have not been seen since.

Victims 
The oldest of the girls, Mary Rachel Trlica (née Arnold), was 17 years old at the time of her disappearance. She is known to go by her middle name of Rachel. She is a Caucasian female,  in height, with long brown hair, green eyes, a chipped upper front tooth, and a small scar on her chin. She was a married high school student at Southwest High School in Fort Worth and drove a 1972 Oldsmobile 98, the car the girls took to the mall on the day of the disappearance. At the time she vanished, Rachel had been married to her husband, Tommy Trlica, for about six months and wore a wedding ring.

Lisa Renee Wilson was 14 years old at the time of her disappearance. She is known to go by her middle name of Renee. She is a fair-skinned Caucasian female,  in height, with light wavy brown hair, brown eyes, and a scar on the inside of one of her thighs. Clothing she was known to be wearing when she disappeared includes bluish-purple hip hugger pants, a white pullover sweatshirt with "Sweet Honesty" in green letters (some have reported it as a pale yellow T-shirt with green letters), red and white Oxford shoes, and a promise ring with a single clear stone.

The youngest of the girls, Julie Ann Moseley, was 9 years old at the time of her disappearance. She is a Caucasian female,  in height, with shoulder-length sandy blonde hair and blue eyes. She has a small scar under her left eye, a scar in the middle of her forehead, and a scar on the back of her calf. Clothing she was known to be wearing when she disappeared included a red shirt with dark pants (jeans) and red tennis shoes.

The case shocked the Fort Worth community and left the families to adjust to life without their children. Thousands of leads have been followed, dozens of searches completed and hundreds of people interviewed. All have proven fruitless.

Disappearance 
On the morning of December 23, 1974, a little before noon, Rachel Trlica, Renee Wilson, and Julie Ann Moseley set out to go Christmas shopping. Moseley asked to tag along at the last minute because she “didn’t want to spend the day alone”. On being told that she would need to get permission to go, Moseley ran inside and called her mother, Rayanne, who would later recall: "I was working for an electrical contractor, and my husband and I were separated. It was a bitter, bitter time. I remember that Julie called and wanted to go to Seminary South. I said, 'No. You don't have any money. You just stay home.' I knew Renee and her mother, but I really didn't know Rachel. But she [Julie] kept whining about how she wouldn't have anybody to play with. ... I finally gave in, but I told her to be home by six." The older girls, specifically Renee, wanted to be back by 4:00pm because she had a Christmas party she wanted to attend with her new boyfriend, who had given her a promise ring that morning. She wanted plenty of time to get ready.

The girls first headed to a surplus store in Fort Worth to pick up some layaway items that Renee had waiting. From there, they headed to the Seminary South Shopping Center. Several witnesses had reported seeing the girls in the mall that day. When the girls did not return home, the families became concerned and traveled to Seminary South to search for them. They arrived around 6:00pm that evening to find their car parked in the Sears upper-level parking lot. It appeared the girls had made it back to the car that afternoon as the gifts they had purchased were found in the car. The family stayed at the mall all night waiting for the girls to return.

Search and investigation 
When the girls failed to turn up, the police were called and the case was quickly handed to the youth division of the Fort Worth Police Department's (FWPD) Missing Persons Bureau. The girls were presumed to be runaways by investigators. As if to prove this point, the next day Tommy Trlica, Rachel's husband, received a letter that appeared to have been written by her. It read:

I know I'm going to catch it, but we had to get away. We're going to Houston. See you in about a week. The car is in Sear's [sic] upper lot. Love Rachel

While the addressed envelope was written in pencil, the letter itself was written in ink and on a sheet of paper that was wider than the envelope. It was addressed to "Thomas A. Trlica" instead of the less-formal "Tommy" as Rachel called him. "Rachel" was written in the upper left-hand corner of the envelope. It appeared to be initially misspelled, as the "l" in her name was written as a lower-case “e”, but then it had been gone over again to form the correct "l". The postmark did not contain a city, only a blurred zip code that appeared to be "76083"; the number "3" appeared to either be backward, as though it was applied by a hand-loaded stamp, or a partial "8". It is assumed that the zip code was meant to be either 76038, which comes from Eliasville, or 76088, which comes from Weatherford. During the subsequent decades, handwriting experts across the nation, including from the Federal Bureau of Investigation (FBI), have yielded inconclusive results from analyzing the letter.

Despite receiving the letter, the families did not believe that it was written by Rachel nor that the girls had run away. Rayanne Moseley stated, "I know my daughter, and I know those other girls and they are not runaways." Judy Wilson, Renee's mother, stated: "I could have told you that night that they didn't run away. [Renee] wanted to go to that party. And no nine-year-old is going to run off two days before Christmas. Everybody knows that!" Frances Langston, Rachel's mother, believed the girls had been abducted, saying, "A lot of people may think they left with someone they knew, but I'll always think—until the day I die—that the girls were taken."

Not willing to give in, the families continued their search by distributing missing person fliers throughout the state and contacting newspapers across the country. Eventually, tips began to come in and witnesses began to come forward. In early 1975, one young man claiming to be an acquaintance of Rachel's stepped forward and claimed that he saw the three girls in the record department of a store inside the mall just before they disappeared. Apparently he and Rachel saw each other and spoke briefly. The man claimed that another person appeared to be with the girls. During this same time, some women's clothes were found in Justin, but it was determined that they did not belong to the girls.

Frustrated with the police investigation, the families decided to hire a private detective named Jon Swaim. In August 1975, Swaim discovered that a 28-year-old man, who had worked for a local store where Rachel had applied for a job before her disappearance, was making a string of obscene phone calls in the area. It was discovered that the man was using his position to obtain information from young women who had either entered job applications or who were listed as references. Six female job applicants had been receiving obscene phone calls. The man also once lived in the neighborhood of Rachel's parents but moved away shortly before she married. In the end, nothing ever came of this suspect.

In April 1975, Swaim went to Port Lavaca with 100 volunteers to search under local bridges after receiving a tip that the girls had been killed and taken there. However, no trace of the girls was found. A year later, three skeletons were found in a field in Brazoria County by an oil drilling crew. Swaim had the bones checked against x-rays and dental records of the girls, but it turned out that the bones belonged to a teenage boy about 15–17 years of age and two other females who were not identified as being any of the girls. In March 1976, a psychic called one of the families and told them that the girls could be found near an oil well. For some reason, the searchers focused on the small community of Rising Star outside of Abilene, but nothing was ever found.

In 1979, Swaim died following a drug overdose; his death was subsequently ruled to be suicide. Upon his death, he ordered that all of his files on the case be destroyed.

In the spring of 1981, police investigators were called to a location in Brazoria County after human remains had been found in a swampy area. After a month of investigation, they discovered that the bones did not belong to the three girls.

In January 2001, the case was reopened and assigned to a homicide detective, Tom Boetcher, who believes the girls left the mall with someone they trusted: "We can say that they were at one point seen with one individual, but we believe there was more than one involved."

In 2018, two cars were raised from Benbrook Lake because they were thought to have a connection to the case. These efforts, however, yielded no results.

Over the years, searchers have continued to comb through Texas brush and have explored hundreds of back roads. The families have walked creek beds and country roads only to come up with nothing. Decades after the girls' disappeared, there have been no reports of new developments in the case.

Other possible witnesses 
A store clerk came forward around the time of the girls' disappearance and said that a woman told her that she had seen the girls at the mall that day. The woman reported that she saw three girls being forced into a yellow pickup truck near Buddies grocery store at the mall. The truck was described to have lights on top of it. This witness, however, could never be located by police and the story was never verified.

In 1981, years after the disappearance, a man said he had been in the parking lot that day and had seen a man forcing a girl into a van. The man in the van told him it was a family dispute and to stay out of it.

In April 2001, Bill Hutchins, a former Fort Worth policeman and security guard at the Seminary South Sears outlet, said that he saw the three girls with a security guard on the night they disappeared.

See also 
List of people who disappeared

References

External links
Fort Worth Texas Police Department

1970s missing person cases
1974 in Texas
December 1974 events in the United States
Mass disappearances
Missing American children
Missing person cases in Texas
Trios
Year of birth missing (living people)
History of women in Texas